SMS Prinz Adalbert ("His Majesty's Ship Prince Adalbert") was an armored cruiser built in the early 1900s for the German Kaiserliche Marine (Imperial Navy), named after Prince Adalbert of Prussia, former Commander-in-Chief of the Prussian Navy. She was the lead ship of her class, which included a second ship, . Prinz Adalbert was built at the Imperial Dockyard in Kiel. Her keel was laid in April 1900, and she was launched in June 1901. Her completion in January 1904 had been delayed by a surplus of construction projects at the Imperial Dockyard. She was armed with a main battery of four  guns, a significant improvement over the previous armored cruiser, which carried only two  guns.

Upon commissioning, Prinz Adalbert served as a gunnery training ship, a role she held for the majority of her career. She trained with the Heimatflotte (Home Fleet), later renamed the Hochseeflotte (High Seas Fleet), throughout the early 1900s, and she made several visits to foreign countries. After the outbreak of World War I in July 1914, she was assigned to the reconnaissance forces in the Baltic and was tasked with protecting the German coast from Russian attacks. After her sister ship was sunk in November 1914, she became the flagship of the cruiser squadron in the Baltic. She conducted operations against Russian forces, including bombarding the port of Libau in support of the German Army. She was torpedoed by a British submarine in July 1915, but was able to return to port and was repaired. She was torpedoed a second time on 23 October 1915; the torpedo detonated her ammunition magazines and destroyed the ship. She sank quickly with heavy loss of life; only three men were rescued from a crew of 675. This proved to be the worst German naval disaster in the Baltic during the war.

Design

The law called for a force of fourteen armored cruisers that would be able to serve in Germany's colonial empire and scout for the main German fleet in home waters. The need to fill both roles was the result of budgetary limitations, which prevented Germany from building vessels specialized to each task. The Prinz Adalbert design was based on that of the previous armored cruiser, but incorporated a more powerful armament and more comprehensive armor protection.

Prinz Adalbert displaced  as built and  fully loaded. She was powered by three vertical triple-expansion steam engines, with steam provided by fourteen coal-fired water-tube boilers. The ship's crew consisted of 35 officers and 551 enlisted men.

She was armed with four  guns arranged in two twin-gun turrets, one on either end of the superstructure, a significant improvement over Prinz Heinrich, which carried only two guns in single turrets. Her secondary armament consisted of ten 15 cm (5.9 in) guns in individual casemate mounts. For defense against torpedo boats, she carried a battery of twelve  guns, also in individual mounts. She was also equipped with four  underwater torpedo tubes, one in the bow, one in the stern, and one on each broadside.

Service history
Prinz Adalbert was ordered under the provisional name "B" and built at the Imperial Dockyard in Kiel under construction number 27. Her keel was laid in April 1900 and she was launched on 22 June 1901. The launching ceremony was attended by the Kaiser, Wilhelm II, his wife Kaiserin Augusta Victoria, his brother Admiral Prince Heinrich and Wilhem's son, Prince Adalbert of Prussia. The ceremony of christening the ship was performed by Princess Irene of Prussia, wife of Prince Heinrich, who then delivered a speech. Fitting-out work proceeded slowly, in large part the result of the Imperial Dockyard attempting to build too many ships at once, but the work was eventually completed by 12 January 1904. Prinz Adalbert was commissioned into the Imperial German Navy the same day for sea trials, with Kapitän zur See (Captain at Sea) Hermann Jacobsen in command; the ship was slated for service as a gunnery training ship. She had cost the Imperial German Government 16,371,000 Goldmarks. Sea trials were completed by 30 May, after which Prinz Adalbert began her duties as a gunnery training ship.

In September, the ship took part in the annual autumn maneuvers with the rest of the Heimatflotte (Home Fleet). A special training unit consisting of reserve ships, training ships like Prinz Adalbert, and a flotilla of torpedo boats was created in early 1905; Prinz Adalbert was the flagship of the unit from 1905 to 1907, flying the flag of Konteradmiral (Rear Admiral) Hugo Zeye. Prinz Adalbert and the light cruiser  escorted Kaiser Wilhelm II's yacht Hohenzollern to Sweden for a visit to King Oscar II in July 1905. The tests were observed by Konteradmiral Ludwig Schröder, the Inspector of Naval Weapons, aboard Prinz Adalbert. Wilhelm II boarded Prinz Adalbert for the conclusion of the exercises, in which the ship towed an old torpedo boat filled with cork while the light cruisers and torpedo boats fired on it with live shells. Prinz Adalbert did not participate in the 1905 autumn maneuvers, though she was present for the naval review at the end of the exercises on 13 September. In February 1906, the tender  was assigned to support Prinz Adalbert. From 17 to 28 June, the cruiser served as the flagship of Prince Heinrich, then the commander of the Baltic Sea Naval Station. During this period the ship traveled to Norway to take part in the coronation festivities for King Haakon VII.

The cruiser again took part in the autumn maneuvers in 1907 and 1909. During the latter maneuvers, Prinz Adalbert took part in the Reserve Division, commanded again by Zeye, who had now been promoted to Vizeadmiral (Vice Admiral). The ship served as the flagship of the III Scouting Group, under Konteradmiral Johannes Merten, who would go on to command the Ottoman fortifications at the Dardanelles during World War I. In March 1910 and March 1911, Prinz Adalbert conducted gunnery tests in the northern North Sea and visited Tórshavn and Vestmanna in the Faeroe Islands. She visited Ålesund in Norway in July and August that year. The ship's first period in service came to an end in September, following a large naval review in the Kiel roadstead for Wilhelm II and Archduke Franz Ferdinand, the heir to the Austro-Hungarian throne, which began on 5 September. Prinz Adalbert was then decommissioned in Kiel on the 29th, with the armored cruiser  taking her place as the fleet's gunnery training ship. After a lengthy overhaul, Prinz Adalbert returned to service on 1 November 1912, again with the artillery school. She was based in Sonderburg, where she replaced the armored cruiser Prinz Heinrich.

World War I

At the outbreak of World War I in July 1914, Prinz Adalbert was brought into front-line service with the fleet, and Kapitän zur See Andreas Michelsen took command of the ship. She was assigned to the IV Scouting Group, under the command of Konteradmiral Hubert von Rebeur-Paschwitz. On 26 August, she was sent to rescue the light cruiser , which had run aground earlier that day, though she was recalled after the Germans received word that Magdeburgs crew had been forced to scuttle the ship. The ship was briefly detached to guard the Great Belt after the Germans received false intelligence suggesting that British warships would try to penetrate the Baltic. She then joined the High Seas Fleet for a sortie into the North Sea on 2–4 November.

After her sister ship  was sunk in November 1914, Prinz Adalbert was detached from the IV Scouting Group to replace her in the Coastal Defense Division in the Baltic on 29 November. She became the flagship for Admiral Ehler Behring, the commander of the cruiser detachment in the Baltic, on 7 December. On 6 January 1915, Prinz Adalbert, Thetis, Augsburg, Lübeck, and several torpedo boats and U-boats went on a patrol toward Utö, where they discovered a Russian base for submarines. The Germans planned to attack the base with the torpedo boats and Thetis, since she had the shallowest draft, but due to a miscommunication, the attack was not carried out.

On 22 January 1915, Prinz Adalbert, in company with Augsburg and several torpedo boats, conducted another reconnaissance sweep toward Åland. While on the return voyage, she bombarded Russian positions at Libau. She ran aground off Steinort during the operation, and Augsburg struck a mine off Bornholm. After being freed from her grounding, the ship was repaired; Michelsen temporarily served as the detachment commander in place of Behring from 13 February to 9 March, when the ship was ready to return to service. Behring returned to Prinz Adalbert on 20 March. In the meantime, the Russians had briefly captured Memel. The Admiralstab (Admiralty Staff) detached the II Battle Squadron, II Scouting Group, and two flotillas of torpedo boats from the High Seas Fleet to reinforce the forces in the Baltic. The ships began to make diversionary attacks to support the German Army's campaign to retake Memel; Prinz Adalbert supported one such operation, a raid of the II Scouting Group into the Bothnian Sea to attack Russian merchant shipping on 23 March. The following day, the ships from the High Seas Fleet were recalled to the North Sea, leaving Behring's cruisers alone once again.

Behring conducted one last operation from 13 to 17 April, with Prinz Adalbert, Thetis, and Lübeck, to support the minelayer , which laid a minefield off Dagö. On the 20th, the Admiralstab instituted a reorganization of the Baltic Sea forces, and Behring was replaced with Konteradmiral Albert Hopman. At the same time, Michelsen was promoted to Hopman's chief of staff, with his place as Prinz Adalberts commanding officer being taken by Kapitän zur See Wilhelm Bunnemann. The ship remained the flagship of the unit, and Hopman made his first cruise aboard the vessel from Kiel to Danzig on 27 April. At this time, Generalfeldmarschall (General Field Marshal) Paul von Hindenburg, the commander in chief of German forces on the Eastern Front, ordered a major assault on Libau. Hopman ordered his forces to support an attempt by the German Army to seize the city. The pre-dreadnoughts of the IV Battle Squadron and the IV Scouting Group were allocated to Hopman's command to provide additional support to the operation. The attack took place on 7 May, and consisted of Prinz Adalbert and the armored cruisers  and Prinz Heinrich, the elderly coast defense ship , and the cruisers Augsburg, Thetis, and Lübeck. They were escorted by a number of destroyers, torpedo boats, and minesweepers. The bombardment went as planned, though the destroyer  struck a mine in Libau's harbor, which blew off her bow and destroyed the ship. German ground forces were successful in their assault and they took the city.

On 1 July, the minelayer , escorted by the cruisers Roon, Augsburg, and Lübeck and seven destroyers, laid a minefield north of Bogskär. While returning to port, the flotilla separated into two sections; Augsburg, Albatross, and three destroyers made for Rixhöft while the remainder of the unit went to Libau. Augsburg and Albatross were intercepted by a powerful Russian squadron commanded by Rear Admiral Bakhirev, consisting of three armored and two light cruisers. Commodore Johannes von Karpf, the flotilla commander, ordered the slower Albatross to steam for neutral Swedish waters and recalled Roon and Lübeck. Albatross was grounded off Gotland and Augsburg escaped, and the Russian squadron briefly engaged Roon before both sides broke contact. Upon being informed of the situation, Hopman sortied with Prinz Adalbert and Prinz Heinrich to support von Karpf. While en route, the cruisers encountered the British submarine , which scored a hit on Prinz Adalbert. The torpedo hit below the conning tower, caused severe damage, and killed ten men. Hopman transferred to the torpedo boat  while Michelsen remained aboard Prinz Adalbert to oversee the return to port. She instead had to make the journey back to Kiel for repairs, which she reached on 4 July.

Repairs were finally completed by September 1915. They encountered no Russian forces and returned to port on the 23rd. Another operation followed on 5 October; this was in company with Prinz Heinrich and Bremen, and was to cover a minelayer as it laid a field to the northwest of Östergarn. The ships completed their mission the next day and returned to port without incident. On 19 October, Hopman transferred his flag to Roon and ordered Prinz Adalbert to take up a patrol between Fårö and Dagerort. The ship was steaming some 20 miles west of Libau, en route to her patrol area, in company with a pair of destroyers on 23 October when she was intercepted by the submarine . E8 fired a spread of torpedoes at a range of approximately 1,200 m (1,300 yd), detonating the ship's ammunition magazine. The massive explosion destroyed the ship, which sank immediately with the loss of 672 crew. There were only three survivors. The sinking was the greatest single loss of life for the German Baltic forces during the war.

See also
 List by death toll of ships sunk by submarines

Notes

Footnotes

Citations

References

Further reading
 

Prinz Adalbert-class cruisers
Ships built in Kiel
1901 ships
World War I cruisers of Germany
Ships sunk by British submarines
World War I shipwrecks in the Baltic Sea
Maritime incidents in 1915
Naval magazine explosions